An economy is an area of the production, distribution, or trade, and consumption of goods and services by different agents in a given geographical location in various countries

Economy may also refer to:

Finance and economics
 Economy, or frugality, the quality of being efficient or frugal in using resources;
 Economies of scale, a firm’s average cost savings from greater output
 Virtual economy, an economy simulated in a virtual world
 World economy, the economy of the world

Places 
 Economy, Arkansas, an unincorporated community in Burnett Township, Pope County, Arkansas, United States
 Economy, Indiana, United States
 Economy, Missouri, United States
 Economy, Nova Scotia, an unincorporated community in Maritime Canada
 Economy, Pennsylvania, United States
 Old Economy Village, Pennsylvania, United States

People
 Elizabeth Economy (born 1962), American scholar and China-watcher

Arts, entertainment, and media
 Economy (album), a 2011 album by John Mark McMillan
 Economy (Thoreau), a chapter from Henry David Thoreau's book Walden
 "Jazz ist anders" (Economy), the economy-version of Die Ärzte's album "Jazz ist anders"qt

Religion
 Economy (religion), a bishop's discretionary power to relax rules
 Economy of Salvation,  that part of divine revelation that deals with God’s creation and management of the world, particularly His plan for salvation accomplished through the Church

Other uses
 Economy (basketball), a basketball mathematical statistical formula
 Economy class (also called cattle class, scum class, standard class, or steerage class, as well as third class or fourth class on railways, or tourist class on ocean liners), the lowest travel class of seating in air, ferry, maritime, and rail travel
 Premium economy, a class of seating in airline travel

See also
 Oikonomos
 Economic (cyclecar), a British three-wheeled cyclecar
 Economics (disambiguation)

Economics disambiguation pages